Marginella sebastiani is a species of sea snail, a marine gastropod mollusk in the family Marginellidae, the margin snails.

Description

Distribution
This  marine species occurs off Senegal.

References

 Marche-Marchad, I. & Rosso, J.-C., 1979. Une nouvelle marginelle de la côte occidentale d'Afrique: Marginella sebastiana sp. Nov. (Gastropoda, Marginellidae). Bollettino Malacologico 15(7-8): 197-208
 Cossignani T. (2006). Marginellidae & Cystiscidae of the World. L'Informatore Piceno. 408pp

sebastiani
Gastropods described in 1979